Washington was a revenue cutter that served in the United States Revenue Cutter Service and in the United States Navy. She discovered, boarded, and captured La Amistad after the slaves onboard had seized control of that schooner in an 1839 mutiny.

Service history
Washington was the second cutter of that name to serve the Navy and was named after Peter G. Washington, who had served as a clerk in the Treasury, chief clerk to the 6th Auditor, 1st Assistant Postmaster General, and Assistant Secretary of the Treasury. Authorized on 6 July 1837 and named on 1 August 1837, she was built under the supervision of Captain H.D. Hunter, U.S. Revenue Marine. Washington was apparently built quickly, as orders were issued on 11 November 1837 for the ship to conduct "winter cruising" off the eastern seaboard between New York and the Virginia capes. She sailed on 18 December on her first cruise. In ensuing years, the ship cruised that stretch of sea in the winters and conducted sounding and surveying operations off the coast in the summers of 1838 and 1839. She was rerigged from a schooner to a brig during that period, apparently at Baltimore, Maryland.

While sounding between Gardiner's Point and Montauk Point, N.Y., in the summer of 1839, the cutter encountered evidence of a grim event at sea. On 26 August 1839, Washington sighted a "suspicious-looking vessel" at anchor. The brig's commander, Lt. Thomas R. Gedney, USN, sent an armed party to board the craft.

The men found the suspicious ship to be the schooner La Amistad, of and from Havana, Cuba. She had set sail from the coast of Africa two months or so before, carrying two white passengers and 54 slaves, bound for Guanaja, Cuba. Four days out of port, the slaves rose and killed the captain and his crew, saving the two passengers to navigate the ship back to Africa. During the next two months, in which La Amistad had drifted at sea, nine of the slaves had died.

Washington was transferred to the United States Coast Survey, one of the ancestors of today's National Oceanic and Atmospheric Administration, on 23 April 1840. For the next 12 years, the brig operated under the aegis of the Navy, off the eastern seaboard of the United States on surveying and sounding duties. All was not entirely tranquil, however, for there were storms to be contended with. While stationed in Chesapeake Bay in 1846, Washington was dismasted in a severe gale. Battered and worn but still afloat, the cutter limped to port. She had lost 11 men overboard in the tempest, including Lt. George M. Bache, the ship's commanding officer.

When the Mexican–American War began, Washington served with Commodore Matthew C. Perry's forces. Under the command of Lt. Comdr. Samuel Phillips Lee, Washington took part in the capture of Tabasco on 16 June 1847 and contributed six officers and 30 men to a force under the command of Capt. S. L. Breese that formed part of the 1,173-man landing force that attacked and captured the Mexican stronghold at Tuxpan.

Returned to the Treasury Department on 18 May 1852, Washington underwent extensive repairs at New York which lasted into the early winter. Alterations were completed on 9 December 1852, but Washington remained in the New York area where she operated locally for the next six years. The cutter participated in the search for the foundering steamer San Francisco in the second week of January 1854. Washington, along with five other revenue cutters, sailed almost simultaneously from their home ports—ranging from New London, Connecticut, to Wilmington, Delaware, and from Norfolk, Virginia to New York City. Unfortunately, none of the ships fell in with San Francisco.

Ordered to the Gulf of Mexico in the spring of 1859 to relieve Robert McClelland, Washington apparently arrived at Southwest Pass, Louisiana, soon afterwards. She apparently remained there into 1861; and, although slated to be relieved, in turn, by Robert McClelland the outbreak of the American Civil War caught the brig at New Orleans where she was taken over by authorities of Louisiana soon after that state seceded from the Union on 31 January 1861. Little is known of the ship thereafter. In June 1861, Commodore David Dixon Porter reported that the ship was being fitted out at New Orleans, Louisiana,  and was almost ready for sea.

On 25 April 1862, Confederate forces scuttled Washington at the docks in New Orleans to prevent her capture by the squadron of Flag Officer David Glasgow Farragut, which arrived at New Orleans that day.

See also

Union Navy
Union Blockade
United States Revenue Cutter Service
United States Coast Guard
List of United States Navy ships

References

Cutters of the United States Navy
Ships of the United States Revenue Cutter Service
Mexican–American War ships of the United States
Ships of the Confederate States of America
1837 ships
Scuttled vessels
Shipwrecks of the American Civil War
Shipwrecks of the Mississippi River
Maritime incidents in April 1862
Captured ships